The MIÉP–Jobbik Third Way Alliance of Parties (MIÉP–Jobbik a Harmadik Út pártszövetség) was an electoral alliance in Hungary led by István Csurka (Hungarian Justice and Life Party) and Dávid Kovács (Jobbik). In 2005, the Hungarian Justice and Life Party (MIÉP) joined forces with a newer political party, namely the Jobbik (Movement for a Better Hungary), and some members of the agricultural Independent Smallholders Party. The new political formation was registered under the name "Third Way" (Harmadik Út).

Program
The common program of the electoral alliance from the Campaign Diary came out in 2006.
 The unfair EU accession treaty needs to be reviewed. Hungary can not be a colony!
 Hungarian land must be kept in Hungarian hands.
 The work of a nurturing mother of her children has to be recognized as a full-time profession. 
 The party initiates family tax benefits and a total tax exemption for families with three or more children.
 The Christian churches are needed in the educating and teaching activities for children and the whole society in culture, education and the media.
 The survival of the Hungarian culture depends on the preservation of the Hungarian language.
 Giving dual citizenship to Hungarians living abroad and support their autonomy pursuits - Székely autonomy initiatives (Szeklerland, Romania), Autonomy of Vojvodina (Serbia), Autonomy in the southern part of Felvidék (Slovakia) and Autonomy of Carpathian Ruthenia (Ukraine).
 Remembering on the memory of the tragedy of Trianon and on the Hungarian Revolution of 1956.
 Punishment have to be tightened in all areas. 
 Restoration of death penalty.
 Revision of earlier privatizations, and invalidation of corrupt asset acquisitions.
 Property taxes for billionaires.
 Abolishment of tax incentives of multinational corporations, and obligation of banks to proportionate public burden sharing. 
 Support of Hungarian entrepreneurs and producers.
 Stopping the massive settling of strangers into the country.
 Reducing the retirement age to 55 years for women and to 60 years for men.
 Reinforcing the defence and setting up a high-ranking, armed National Guard to protect the inner order and against external attacks.

Results
At the 2006 legislative election, April 9 and 23, the party won 2.2% of the popular vote and no seats. The alliance broke up shortly thereafter.

National Assembly

References

Sources

External links
"Third way" platform: The nationalist right gets together (HVG)

Jobbik
Defunct political party alliances in Hungary
Far-right political parties in Hungary
Nationalist parties in Hungary
Third Position
Right-wing parties in Europe
2005 establishments in Hungary
2006 disestablishments in Hungary
Defunct nationalist parties
Defunct conservative parties
National conservative parties
Social conservative parties
Conservative parties in Hungary
Political parties established in 2005
Political parties disestablished in 2006